José Freire Falcão (23 October 1925 – 26 September 2021) was a Brazilian prelate of the Catholic Church who was archbishop of Brasília from 1984 to 2004. He was created a cardinal in 1988.

Biography
José Freire Falcão was born on 23 October 1925, in Ererê in the state of Ceara. He entered the seminary in Fortaleza at the age of 14. He was ordained a priest on 19 June 1949.

He was teaching at the seminary and leading the diocesan liturgy commission when, on 24 April 1967, Pope Paul VI named him titular bishop of Vardimissa and bishop coadjutor of Limoeiro do Norte. He received his episcopal consecration on 17 June and succeeded as bishop on 19 August. He was transferred to the Archdiocese of Teresina on 25 November 1971.

Pope John Paul II appointed him archbishop of Brasília on 15 February 1984 and created him a cardinal on 28 June 1988, assigning him as a cardinal priest to San Luca a Via Prenestina.

He retired as archbishop of Brasília upon the appointment of his successor on 28 January 2004.

He was one of the cardinal electors who participated in the 2005 papal conclave that elected Pope Benedict XVI.

On 17 September 2021, Falcão was admitted to hospital as a precaution after being diagnosed with COVID-19. On 24 September, the Archdiocese of Brasilia announced Falcão's health had deteriorated, that he was intubated and in grave condition after suffering kidney and respiratory complications. He died from complications of the virus on 26 September 2021, at the age of 95. His Funeral Mass and burial in the crypt of the cathedral took place the next day.

References

External links
 
 José Falcão Freire
  

1925 births
2021 deaths
20th-century Roman Catholic archbishops in Brazil
Brazilian cardinals
Cardinals created by Pope John Paul II
People from Ceará
Roman Catholic archbishops of Brasília
Roman Catholic archbishops of Teresina
Roman Catholic bishops of Limoeiro do Norte
Deaths from the COVID-19 pandemic in Federal District (Brazil)